The first cabinet of Petre S. Aurelian was the government of Romania from 21 November 1896 to 26 March 1897.

Ministers
The ministers of the cabinet were as follows:

President of the Council of Ministers:
Petre S. Aurelian (21 November 1896 - 26 March 1897)
Minister of the Interior: 
Vasile Lascăr (21 November 1896 - 26 March 1897)
Minister of Foreign Affairs: 
Constantin I. Stoicescu (21 November 1896 - 13 March 1897)
(interim) Petre S. Aurelian (13 - 26 March 1897)
Minister of Finance:
George C. Cantacuzino-Râfoveanu (21 November 1896 - 13 March 1897)
(interim) Vasile Lascăr (13 - 26 March 1897)
Minister of Justice:
Ștefan Șendrea (21 November 1896 - 26 March 1897)
Minister of War:
(interim) Constantin I. Stoicescu (21 - 25 November 1896)
Gen. Anton Berindei (25 November 1896 - 26 March 1897)
Minister of Religious Affairs and Public Instruction:
George Mârzescu (21 November 1896 - 26 March 1897)
Minister of Agriculture, Industry, Commerce, and Property:
Petre S. Aurelian (21 November 1896 - 26 March 1897)
Minister of Public Works:
Emanoil Porumbaru (21 November 1896 - 26 March 1897)

References

Cabinets of Romania
Cabinets established in 1896
Cabinets disestablished in 1897
1896 establishments in Romania
1897 disestablishments in Romania